Six ships of the Royal Navy have been named HMS Colchester, after the town of Colchester:

  was a 24-gun ship launched in 1654 and sunk in action in 1666.
  was an 8-gun ketch launched in 1664 and captured by the French in 1667.
  was a 48-gun fourth-rate frigate launched in 1694. She foundered in 1704.
  was a 54-gun fourth-rate frigate launched in 1707, rebuilt in 1721 and broken up in 1742.
  was a 50-gun fourth-rate frigate launched in 1744 and wrecked later that year on the Kentish Knock.
  was a 50-gun fourth-rate frigate launched in 1746 and broken up in 1773.
  was built for the Great Eastern Railway as a cargo ship and requisitioned in 1942 as a wreck dispersal vessel.
 HMS Colchester Castle was a planned , cancelled in 1943.

References
 British Warship Losses in the Age of Sail 1650 - 1859 (D Hepper)
 

Royal Navy ship names